The Association of Christian Librarians (ACL) is a non-profit, professional organization of librarians whose members are evangelical Christians.  The stated mission of the organization is to “strengthen libraries through professional development of evangelical librarians, scholarship, and spiritual encouragement for service in higher education.” ACL holds a national conference each year hosted by one of its member institutions.   ACL also publishes The Christian Librarian and the Christian Periodical Index, an index of articles and reviews written from an evangelical point of view labeled as "the leading guide to periodical literature from the evangelical perspective" by the Encyclopedia of Library and Information Sciences.

History
The organization began in 1957 with seventeen initial members and has grown slowly over the course of its history. In 1993 it had roughly 300 members, and as of 2021 ACL's membership had grown to over 650 members from 403 unique institutions with 23 countries represented.

Membership

The membership requirement requires profession of the Christian faith as outlined by the association's statement of faith. Associate memberships are available for non-librarians who both agree with the ACL's statement of faith and are interested in libraries or librarianship.

References

Further reading
 The Association of Christian Librarians. "Association of Christian Librarians."  http://www.acl.org (accessed Oct. 29 2012).
 Ashby, Patricia W.  The Association of Christian Librarians. Master's thesis, Kent State University, 1993.  In ERIC, http://www.eric.ed.gov/ERICWebPortal/detail?accno=ED367322 (accessed Oct. 26, 2012).
 Brock, Lynn and Tonya Fawcett.  “National Library Conference Coming to Cedarville.” Centential Library E-News, 18:3, 2011: p. 3.  https://www.cedarville.edu/Academics/Library/Whats-New/~/media/Files/PDF/Library/ENews/enews2011feb.pdf (accessed Oct. 29, 2012).
 Hawkins, Donald T.  “Large Association Conferences on the Horizon.”  Information Today, 24:6 2007: p. 26-27.
 Nelson, Corinne and Evan St. Lifer.  "ACL Meets in Record Numbers." Library Journal. 121:16 (October 1, 1996): p. 16.
 Stuehrenberg, Paul F. "Theological Librarianship." In Encyclopedia of Library and Information Sciences, 3rd Ed. Taylor & Francis: 2009, p. 5231-37.

External links
Official website
The Christian Librarian - Journal

Christian organizations based in the United States
Library-related professional associations
Christian organizations established in 1957